The Hwangseong Park is a park located in the neighborhood of Hwangseong-dong, Gyeongju, North Gyeongsang province, South Korea. Many of public sport facilities are located in the park with an area of 1,022,350 m2 including a luxuriant pine trees forest. The site is originally where Doksan was situated, an artificial forest established in regards to feng shui during the Silla period. The Doksan forest was used as a training place for hwarang warriors, and a recreation venue as well as a hunting place for the Silla Kings, especially the 26th ruler, King Jinpyeong's favorite place. Since 1975, Hwangseong Park has been designated as "city neighborhood park" and currently consists of multi-purposed Gyeongju Public Stadium, Football Park with 7 football fields and one futsal field, and one gymnasium, as well as Horimjang field for gukgung or Korean traditional archery and a ssireum wrestling ring. In addition, it contains a gateball field, an inline skating rink, jogging courses, and cycling roads. Among them, the construction of Gyeongju Public Stadium was completed in 1982.  and can accommodate 20,000 audience.

Facilities
Sports
Gyeongju Public Stadium 
Gyeongju Gymnasium
Gyeongju Football Park
Horimjeong - gukgung (Korean traditional archery) field, 
Ssrieum wrestling ring- Ssireum
Gateball field
Inline skating rink
Jogging courses
Bicycling roads
Memorials and monuments
Statue of General Kim Yusin
Park Mok-wol's poem monument
Chunghon Tower
Gyeongju Municipal Library
Hwangseong-dong resident office

Gallery

References

External links

 황성공원 (Hwangseong Park)

Tourist attractions in Gyeongju
Parks in North Gyeongsang Province